Typhinellus jacolombi is a species of sea snail, a marine gastropod mollusk, in the family Muricidae, the murex snails or rock snails.

Description
The length of the shell attains 19.2 mm.

Distribution
This species occurs in Panamanian part of the Caribbean Sea.

References

External links
  Houart R. (2015). Description of a new species of Typhinellus (Gastropoda: Muricidae: Typhinae) from the Western Atlantic. Zootaxa. 4007(3): 427-432

jacolombi
Gastropods described in 2015